Kumara Thirimadura (born April 17, 1969 as [[:si:කුමාර තිරිමාදුර|කුමාර තිරිමාදුර) [Sinhala) is an actor in Sri Lankan cinema, stage drama and television. He is an actor, singer, filmmaker and journalist by profession. He is considered one of five actors who have dominated the Sri Lankan Stage by critics.

Early career
He was born on 17 April 1969, in Rawathawatta, Moratuwa as the sixth child of the family with seven siblings. His father Thirimadura Rantin de Silva worked in the Sri Lanka Ports Authority. His mother Jothimuni Malini Miureen Perera worked as a cashier in a restaurant. He has four elder sisters - Sandya, Udaya, Ramya, Soumya and one elder brother, Kosala, one younger sister Bhagya and one younger brother Chamila. His sister Sandya died in April 2022. Thirimadura is a past student of Prince of Wales College, Moratuwa.

He won many awards at school level through many theatre works, which gave him boost to the career. But, before turning in to acting career, he worked 14 years as a journalist of Divaina Newspaper. His journalist career stood even after the acting, but he allocated full-time towards acting as his profession. Tissa Gunawardana was his first teacher in drama and theater. Thirimadura first appeared in Street theatres directed by Gamini Haththotuwegama, while he had his first stage play Sakalajana by Dhamma Jagoda.

Acting career
Thirimadura has acted in about 90 stage plays, 58 films and several tele dramas. Nowadays he is seen in popular stage plays like Suba Saha Yasa, Balloth Ekka Be, Balloth Ekka Be 2, Charithe Horu Aran, Ko Kukko, Nari Burathi, Ang Awoo, and Deiyoth Danne Ne. Along with Gihan Fernando, Thirimadura engaged in a stage play Giha Saha Kuma.

While working on with theatre works and journalism, his fellow mate Jayantha Chandrasiri invited him to take part in his teledrama Akala Sandhya, which is Thirimadura's first television screen. Since then, he acted more than 50 teledramas across genre including some notable roles in the serials: Paba, Katu Imbula, Ataka Nataka, Isuru Sangramaya and Hendewa.

As a television host, Thirimadura presented program Maarai Hirai telecasted on TV Derana and program Rasoghaya telecasting on Siyatha TV accompany with Mihira Sirithilaka. On ITN, he currently presents the program called Thirimadura Oba Amathai.

Thirimadura started his film career with Julietge Bumikawa back in 1998, directed by Jackson Anthony. Through that, he performed many dramatic and comedy roles in more than 35+ films up to 2018. Apart from acting, he was also the Production Manager of film Sonduru Dadabima, released in 2003 and screenplay writer of film Thanha Rathi Ranga. The role in this film highly praised by the critics and was a commercial hit as well. He along with Sarath Kothalawala won the Award for the Best Screenplay at Derana Lux Film Awards in 2014 for Thanha Rathi Ranga movie. His first cinema direction came through Newspaper co-directed with Kothalawala was released on 29 June 2020.

In March 2021, a film festival featuring five films starring Thirimadura will be held for five days at the Liberty Hall, Kollupitiya. The festival is named as the "uncrowned prince's felt cinematic procession".

Discography
Thirimadura is an A-grade singer at Sri Lanka Radio Corporation. Though he has not released his solo songs until recently, he has said that he had to sacrifice his early career entirely for the drama and films. He is a die-hard fan of Victor Rathnayake.

Thirimadura released his first solo visual song Ae Mata Adarei in June 2016. He also appeared in the music video of song Bodima by Theekshana Anuradha.

On 31 March 2017, Thirimadura performed a musical show at Maharagama Youth Society Hall at 7pm. He titled his show as Kumaraya Man - Deveni Gamana. At the show, he launched his 14-songs music album Ae Mata Adarei as well.

Songs
Following list is the songs of Kumara Thirimadura.

(01) Adannata Epa 
(02) Lapalu Dalu 
(03) Mata Asai 
(04) Paata Paata Mal Gode 
(05) Paalu Gathiya 
(06) Seethala Udaye 
(07) Me Udakki Kolama 
(08) Malabe Kiyu Kisiveku 
(09) Ae Mata Adarei
(10) Man Boralle Ae Badulle

Television

Notable television serials

 Adare Ahasa Tharam
 Adisi Nadiya 
 Ahas Maliga
 Akaala Sandya
 Angani 
 Bharyawo
 Dadakeli Arana 
 Ethuma 1, 2
 Gaga Laga Gedara
 Gini Avi Saha Gini Keli
 Giri Shikara Meda
 Guru Geethaya 
 Hadawathe Kathawa
 Handewa 
 Herda Sakshiya
 Ingi Bingi
 Isuru Sangramaya 
 Jodu Gedara
 Katu Imbula 
 Kota Uda Mandira
 Labendiye
 Maama Haa Ma
 Nattukkarayo
 Nethaka Maayavee 
 On Ataka Nataka
 Paba
 Raja Kaduwa
 Ralla Weralata Adarei
 Ranga Soba 
 Rathi Virathi 
 Sabba Sakala Manaa
 Samanalunta Wedithiyanna 
 Sanda Numba Nam
 Sapthambaraye Diga Dawasak
 Sapumali 
 Sedona
 Senehasa Kaviyak
 Sidangana 
 Sidu
 Sihina Puraya
 Sihina Tawuma 
 Sihinayak Wage 
 Sihini
 Siri Sirimal 
 Three-wheel Malli 
 Veeduru Mal 
 Visi Eka 
 Walawettuwa
 Wasuli Kanda

Author work
He published the autobiographical book Mage Jeewithe in 2019, which also granted as a educational book by Sri Lanka Education Department. He also wrote the book Karaliye Rasa Katha which was started as a paper column note.

Awards
 Best Actor award - State Drama Festival - 2005 
 Merit Award - Sumathi Awards - 2011
 Best Actor In A Supporting Role – Gamani - 1st Derana Film Award - 2012
 Best Screenplay Writer – Thanha Rathi Raga - 3rd Derana Lux Film Award - 2014
 Merit Award - Sumathi Awards - 2017
 Jury Award - Sumathi Awards - 2017
 Merit Award - Grahambell Wath Sithuwada - Raigam Tele'es - 2017
 Best Supporting Actor - Hiru Golden Film Awards - 2018

Filmography

References

External links
චමින්දල කියල කොල්ලො කීවත් විහිළුවට විසි අටේ තිහේ කෙල්ලො තාමත් අතවනනව අපට
Posts Tagged ‘Kumara Thirimadura’
කුමාර තිරිමාදුර ආදරණීය බිරිඳ සමග
අම්මාට තාත්තාට දේපොළ තිබුණා නම් මාත් ඉතිං... - කුමාර තිරිමාදුර
තිරිමාදුර නූලෙන් බේරෙයි
තිරිමාදුර-කොතලාවල එක්ව හැදූ 'ද නිවුස් පේපර්'
 ශි‍්‍රයන්තගේ තැඹිලි ගෙඩියට තිරිමාදුර විදපු හැටි
 ඇයි අපිට බනින්නේ නැත්ද?

Sri Lankan male film actors
Living people
1969 births